USS Marinette County (LST-953) was an  built for the United States Navy during World War II. Like many of her class, she was not named and is properly referred to by her hull designation. She was later named after Marinette County, Wisconsin, she was the only US Naval vessel to bear the name.

Construction
LST-953 was laid down on 15 September 1944, at Hingham, Massachusetts, by the Bethlehem-Hingham Shipyard; launched on 15 October 1944; and commissioned on 7 November 1944.

Service history
During World War II, LST-953 was assigned to the Asiatic-Pacific theater. LST-953 commenced an east coast shakedown on 12 November 1944, and hastened to join LST Flotilla 21, which was already at Pearl Harbor. Three months of intensive training exercises preceded LST-953s April 1945, voyage to Guam. After a series of supply missions in the southern Marianas, she arrived at Okinawa in the War Zone on 26 June. For five weeks Marine Corps troops and vehicles were shuttled around the island to facilitate mop-up operations.

Post-war activities
The day Japan announced acceptance of surrender terms, LST-953 returned to the Marianas. LST-953 carried elements of the 2nd Marine Division to Nagasaki on 24 September, for the occupation of Japan and men of the US Army's 24th Infantry Division to Matsuyama on 27 October. A "Magic Carpet" voyage back to San Diego concluded its duty in the Pacific.

Decommissioning
In July 1946, she transited the Panama Canal and steamed to Beaumont, Texas. Decommissioned on 12 November 1946, the ship served in the Naval Reserve Program until towed to Green Cove Springs, Florida, on 17 June 1950, for berthing in the Atlantic Reserve Fleet. She was renamed Marinette County on 1 July 1955. On 1 November 1958, her name was struck from the Naval Vessel Register.

Awards
LST-953 earned one battle star for World War II service.

Notes

Citations

Bibliography 

Online resources

External links
 

LST-542-class tank landing ships
World War II amphibious warfare vessels of the United States
Marinette County, Wisconsin
Ships built in Hingham, Massachusetts
1944 ships